Oliver Joseph Burke (1825-1889) was an Irish barrister and historian.

Born at Ower, Headford, County Galway, he was educated at Trinity College, Dublin from 1841, graduating with a B.A. in 1854, the same year he was called to the Irish Bar.

Bibliography

 The Abbey of Ross, Co. Galway - its history and details, E. Ponsonby, Dublin, 1868.
 The History of the Lord Chancellors of Ireland from A.D. 1186 to A.D. 1874, E. Ponsonby, Dublin, 1879.
 The History of the Catholic Archbishops of Tuam, from the foundation of the See to the death of the Most Rev. John MacHale, D.D., A.D. 1881, Hodges Figgis, Dublin, 1882.
 Anecdotes of the Connaught Circuit from its foundation in 1604 to close upon the present time, Hodges Figges, Dublin, 1885.
 The South Isles of Aran, Co. Galway, Kegan, Paul, Trench & Co., London, 1887.

References

External links
 
 

1825 births
1889 deaths
People from County Galway
Irish barristers
19th-century Irish historians
Irish writers
19th-century Irish people